Brooke-Alvinston is a township municipality in the Canadian province of Ontario, located within Lambton County. It was formed on January 1, 2001, when the Township of Brooke (incorporated 1842) was amalgamated with the Village of Alvinston (incorporated on June 12, 1880).

Communities
The municipality comprises the communities of Alvinston, Grays, Inwood, Rokeby, Sutorville, Walnut and Weidman.

Sports
The Brooke Alvinston Inwood Community Centre located in Alvinston contains an arena, auditorium with banquet facilities for 500, and several meeting rooms. It is home to  figure skaters and minor hockey.

Attractions

A.W. Campbell Conservation Area operated by the St. Clair Region Conservation Authority is located near Alvinston. It offers camping, swimming, walking trails and picnic areas. It is also the site an annual maple syrup festival where visitors can view demonstrations of syrup production.

The Brooke Alvinston Watford Fall Fair is held annually in Alvinston.  It features a tractor pull, demolition derby, parade, evening dance, midway, food concessions, exhibits in animal husbandry, field crops, horticulture, baking, art and photography, and school exhibits.

The Alvinston to Watford Optimist Road Race is a 16 kilometre race that begins in Alvinston and ends in Watford. The race, held annually, started in 1958.

Alvinston holds a town-wide garage sale annually in May, a classic car and antique tractor show in June, Canada Day celebrations in July, and a Santa Claus Parade in December.

Recreation
Brooke-Alvinston has two public libraries, in Alvinston and Inwood respectively. Both libraries are part of the Lambton County Library system, which services 25 branches throughout Lambton County.

Education
The Lambton Kent District School Board operates an elementary public school near Alvinston.

Media
Community news is chiefly reported through two newspapers: the Glencoe-Alvinston Transcript & Free Press and the Watford Guide-Advocate. Both publications are owned by Hayter-Walden Publishing. The community is also served by Sarnia and Lambton County This Week, and the Strathroy Focus, both owned by Sun Media Corporation.

Demographics 

See also
List of townships in Ontario

References

External links

Lower-tier municipalities in Ontario
Municipalities in Lambton County